The Tälesbahn may refer to one of two railway lines in Baden-Württemberg:

 Tälesbahn (Nürtingen–Neuffen)
 Tälesbahn (Geislingen–Wiesensteig)